Ceratistes is a genus of beetles belonging to the family Melyridae.

The species of this genus are found in Southern Europe.

Species:
 Ceratistes cervulus (Reitter, 1894)
 Ceratistes dentifrons (Erichson, 1840)

References

Melyridae
Cleroidea genera